Rundu is the capital and largest city of the Kavango-East Region in northern Namibia. Rundu's population is growing rapidly. The 2001 census counted 36,964 inhabitants; and for the 2011 census it has climbed to 63,430.

History 
In 1936, it became the seat of the local governor as it replaced Nkurenkuru as capital of the Kavango district. The town has since grown into a multilingual city of the Kavango region by then now is for Kavango East and only recently its official status was changed to that of a town.

Since 1993, its St. Mary's Cathedral is the episcopal seat of the Roman Catholic Apostolic Vicariate of Rundu.

Politics
Rundu is governed by a town council that has seven seats.

The 2015 local authority election was won by SWAPO which gained five seats (6,973 votes). One seat each went to the local Rundu Concerned Citizens Association (1,043 votes) and the All People's Party (APP, 973 votes). SWAPO also won the 2020 local authority election, obtaining 3,548 votes and gaining four seats. One seat each went to the Rundu Concerned Citizens Association (863 votes), the Rundu Urban Community Commission (386 votes), and the Independent Patriots for Change (IPC), an opposition party formed in August 2020, that gained 321 votes.

Geography

Localities
Many of Rundu's residents live in shacks. In 2020 the town had a total of 18,219 of these informal housing structures, accommodating more than 76,000 inhabitants, more than the most recent (2011) census reported as total population figure.

The oldest houses in Rundu are located in the Katutura area. These houses are mainly two bedroom homes with large backyards even though they are situated next to the central business district.

On the west is Tutungeni, which means "let's build". This area was previously occupied by executives of the white-dominated businessplace, but now it is open for any willing buyer in need of a quiet neighbourhood. On the East is Safari. There are the middle-priced houses built in the 1970s.

These three main localities dominated Rundu residential life until the turn of the millennium in 2000, when new housing projects by O'B Davids Properties built a new residential area called Millennium Park. After which two others have been built by the NHE, Queens and Kings Parks respectively. Recently a new formal location was added called Rainbow

Outside the formal suburbs, shanty towns symbolise the rapid urbanisation of the town and high unemployment rates. Kehemu (Ghetto), Kaisosi (also known by the locals as Cali), Sauyemwa (SA), and Ndama are the most informal areas while a fourth, Donkerhoek (Dark Corner), is rapidly becoming formal since the start of the Build Together Campaign in 1992.

Climate

Rundu has a hot semi-arid climate (Köppen: BSh), with hot summers and relatively mild winters (with warm days and chilly to cool nights). This large swing in daily temperature is more commonplace among areas with cold semi-arid climates. During the summer, the diurnal temperature variation is less pronounced.

Economy and infrastructure

Rundu Open Market
Rundu Open Market is the most well-known and biggest open market in the town. It was founded in 1996 through cooperation between the government of Namibia and the government of Luxembourg.

Transport

The Rundu State Hospital is situated in the center of the town, off Markus Siwarongo street. It's the largest hospital in Kavango East.

Military
There is a military base of the Namibian Defence Force in Rundu. Built in 1972 and expanded in 1976, while South West Africa was under South African occupation, it houses 1,600 soldiers. The base was named Voito Jason Kondjeleni Military Base, after People's Liberation Army of Namibia (PLAN) fighter Voito Jason Kondjeleni who died in 1983.

Education and Culture
Rundu is home to many woodcarvers  and features a woodcarver's market near the open market. Several local restaurants serve traditional food, including mahangu, ground nuts, stewed meats, and fish from the Okavango River.

Schools
There are five tertiary Institutions in Rundu, namely the Rundu College of Education, the Institute of Open Learning (IOL), the Rundu Vocational Training Centre, the Namibia College of Open Learning (NAMCOL) and Triumphant College. The University of Namibia and Polytechnic of Namibia both maintain centres that provide support for students who are studying on distance. There are six secondary schools in the town: Rundu Secondary School, Dr. Alpo Mbamba Secondary School, Dr. Romanus Kampungu Secondary School, Elias Neromba Senior Secondary School, Noordgrens, and Kamunoko Secondary School.

Twin towns – sister cities
Rundu is twinned:

 Cheboksary, Chuvash Republic, Russia
 Nieuwegein, Netherlands

References

 
Regional capitals in Namibia
Towns in Namibia
Populated places in Kavango East
Angola–Namibia border crossings